The subcontinental lithospheric mantle (SCLM) is the uppermost  solid part of Earth's mantle associated with the  continental lithosphere.

The modern understanding of the Earth's upper mantle is that there are two distinct components - the lithospheric part and the asthenosphere. The lithosphere, which includes the continental plates, acts as a brittle solid whereas the asthenosphere is hotter and weaker due to mantle convection. The boundary between these two layers is rheologically based and is not necessarily a strict function of depth. Specifically, oceanic lithosphere (lithosphere underneath the oceanic plates) and subcontinental lithosphere, is defined as a mechanical boundary layer that heats via conduction and the asthenosphere is a convecting adiabatic layer. In contrast to oceanic lithosphere, which experiences quicker rates of recycling, subcontinental lithosphere is chemically distinct, cold, and older. This translated into the differences between the SCLM and the oceanic lithospheric mantle.

There are two different types of subcontinental lithosphere that formed at different times in Earth's history: Archean and Phanerozoic subcontinental mantle.

Archean subcontinental mantle 
Archean lithosphere is strongly depleted in fertile melt indicators such as CaO and Al2O3. This depletion in major-elements should then be consequence of the Archean lithosphere's formation. Trace-elements are abundant in Archean lithosphere relative to MORB (which samples modern upper mantle) and have been sampled by Re-Os isotope dating of peridotites and ophiolites. The trace element composition of these xenoliths suggest mixing between the two different layers of subcontinental mantle. Particularly, the theory for the removal of Archean subcontinental lithosphere below Archean continental crust via delamination helps to explain mantle-peridotite xenoliths found in the extinct Sierra Nevada arc. Though there is evidence for the preservation of the Archean lithosphere, there is controversy over the preservation of the Archean mantle, for which the Archean lithosphere would have been derived.

The formation of the Archean SCLM is enigmatic. One early theory that komatiite melts formed the Archean SCLM does not explain how komatiites, which form in hot and deep environments, creates a reservoir that is shallow and cool. Another model of Archean SCLM formation suggests that the SCLM formed in a subduction environment in which new Archean crust was created through slab melting. If the primitive mantle is the starting composition for this SCLM formation event, subducting slab would be composed of TTG crust, then the removal of basaltic melt and the enrichment of the mantle wedge with felsic melts could explain the formation of the depleted Archean subcontinental lithosphere. For more information, see Archean subduction.

Phanerozoic subcontinental mantle 
The mechanism of arc subduction is well understood to be the location where new continental crust is formed and is presumably also the site of subcontinental mantle genesis. Firstly, hydrated oceanic crust slabs begin subducting which releases fluids (subduction zone metamorphism) to the mantle wedge above. Continued subduction of the slab leads to further hydration of the mantle which causes partial melting in the mantle wedge. It is expected then that the modern subcontinental mantle is a former, melt-depleted mantle wedge. If the connection between continental crust and the subcontinental lithospheric mantle does not exist, and rather a different Earth process formed both reservoirs, then it further complicates the mechanisms for how the Archean subcontinental mantle formed.

References 

Earth's mantle